Thomas Snape (1835 – 9 August 1912) was a British industrialist and Liberal politician.

Snape was born in Salford, and was initially employed by John Hutchinson and Sons, a company that pioneered the use of the Leblanc process to produce soda ash, and led to the creation of a large chemical industry in Widnes, Lancashire. He subsequently established his own business, T. Snape and Company, with its works in the town. In 1890 Snape's became a constituent part of the United Alkali Company.

Snape was a prominent member of the Methodist Free Church and a supporter of the temperance and peace movements. He stood as Liberal candidate for parliament on a number of occasions, but was only successful at the 1892 general election, when he became MP for Heywood. He lost his seat three years later to George Kemp of the Conservatives.

Although no longer in parliament, Snape continued his involvement with politics. At the time of his death he was a county alderman on Lancashire County Council, and a justice of the peace for the county.

Thomas Snape died at his residence in Liverpool in 1912, aged 77.

References

External links 
 

1835 births
1912 deaths
Liberal Party (UK) MPs for English constituencies
UK MPs 1892–1895
Members of Lancashire County Council
People from Widnes